Pileanthus peduncularis, commonly known as coppercups, is a plant species of the family Myrtaceae endemic to Western Australia.

It blooms between August and December producing copper-orange to red flowers which occur in a massed display. The flowers are large with five-petals that occur towards the ends of the branches and from the leaf axils.

The species was first formally described by the botanist Stephan Endlicher in 1838 as part of the work Stirpium Australasicarum Herbarii Hugeliani Decades Tres The only known synonym is Chamelaucium dilatatum.

It is found on sand plains and sand dunes in the Pilbara, Mid West, Wheatbelt and Swan Coastal Plain regions of Western Australia where it grows in sandy soils.

There are two recognised subspecies:
 Pileanthus peduncularis subsp. pilifer
 Pileanthus peduncularis subsp. peduncularis

References

peduncularis
Endemic flora of Western Australia
Myrtales of Australia
Rosids of Western Australia
Taxa named by Stephan Endlicher
Plants described in 1838